Toto and Marcellino is a 1958 Italian-French comedy film directed by Antonio Musu.

Plot 
A little boy, Marcellino, sees his mother die, and follows her to the funeral. A poor street musician, affectionately called by his fellow citizens "the Professor", sees the little Marcellino follow the coffin of his mother, and decides to adopt him, pretending to be his uncle. The two live happily, but one day the real uncle of Marcellino, a greedy and cruel man, discovers the truth about his grandson, and sends Marcellino to the reformatory. Later the uncle forces Marcellino to live with him for doing so begging in the street, but the Professor runs to save his darling.

Cast 

Totò: The Professor 
Pablito Calvo: Marcellino Merini
Fanfulla: Uncle Alvaro Merini
Jone Salinas: Ardea
Memmo Carotenuto: Zeffirino
Wandisa Guida: The School Teacher
Nanda Primavera: Rosina

References

External links

1958 films
1958 comedy films
French comedy films
Italian comedy films
Films scored by Carlo Rustichelli
1958 directorial debut films
1950s French films
1950s Italian films